Ghoul School is a metroidvania video game released for the Nintendo Entertainment System in 1992 by Imagineering. This game takes place in a high school which has been overrun by ghosts/demons.

Gameplay 
Ghoul School is a side-scrolling action-adventure, considered an early example of a metroidvania.

Plot
While taking the usual shortcut home through the cemetery from Cool School High, Senior Spike O'Hara found a strange, glowing skull.  He put it in his backpack to show to his anatomy teacher the next day which happened to be Halloween Eve.  When Dr. Femur wanted to keep the skull for a special study, Spike was concerned because it appeared that the skull was bigger than it was the day before.   Little did anyone know that the skull had begun transmitting its message to the realm of the dead.  The ghouls had begun their assault...

Ghosts/demons have taken over Cool School High. They have turned the teachers and football team into demons. To make matters worse, they have kidnapped Samantha Pompom, the head cheerleader. The player assumes the role of Spike O'Hara as he tries to defeat the ghouls and rescue Samantha. He will have to explore more than 200 rooms and defeat a large number of enemies. There are items and weapons throughout the game that O'Hara can find to defeat the ghouls, though many of these items are well-hidden.

References

External links

Interview with designer Scott Marshall
Ghoul School information at GameFAQs

1992 video games
Electro Brain games
Halloween video games
High school-themed video games
Nintendo Entertainment System games
Nintendo Entertainment System-only games
North America-exclusive video games
Side-scrolling platform games
1990s horror video games
Video games developed in the United States
Metroidvania games
Single-player video games
Imagineer games